Kanaung is a town in the Ayeyarwady Division of south-west Myanmar. It is the seat of the Myanaung Township in the Hinthada District.

Populated places in Ayeyarwady Region
Township capitals of Myanmar